Luke Fortner (born May 15, 1998) is an American football center for the Jacksonville Jaguars of the National Football League (NFL). He played college football at Kentucky.

Early life and high school
Fortner grew up in Sylvania, Ohio and attended Sylvania Northview High School. After Luke graduated Northview High School his successor on the offensive line happened to be his younger brother Matt. Some say Matt was the more talented one.

College career
Fortner redshirted his true freshman season at Kentucky. He appeared in eight games as a redshirt freshman. Fortner played in 11 of Kentucky's 13 games during his redshirt sophomore season. He became the Wildcats' starting left guard going into his redshirt junior season and started 13 games in 2019 and 10 in Kentucky's COVID-19-shortened 2020 season. Fortner decided to utilize the extra year of eligibility granted to college athletes who played in the 2020 season due to the coronavirus pandemic and return to Kentucky for a sixth season. He moved to center during fall training camp and was named first-team All-Southeastern Conference by the league's coaches.

Professional career

Jacksonville Jaguars
Fortner was selected by the Jacksonville Jaguars in the third round, 65th overall, of the 2022 NFL Draft. He was named the Jaguars starting center as a rookie.

References

External links
 Jacksonville Jaguars bio
 Kentucky Wildcats bio

Living people
People from Sylvania, Ohio
American football centers
Kentucky Wildcats football players
Players of American football from Ohio
Jacksonville Jaguars players
1998 births